Maximite Microcomputer is a Microchip PIC32 microcontroller-based microcomputer. Originally designed as a hobby kit, the Maximite was introduced  in a three-part article in Silicon Chip magazine in autumn of  2011 by Australian designer Geoff Graham.
The project consists of two main components — a main circuit board and the MMBasic Interpreter, styled after GW-BASIC.

Versions
Maximite version 2.7 is still an open source project.  Several hobbyists have produced their own custom versions, often using commercially available prototyping circuit boards.

Clones
Several Maximite clones were designed and released in the months following its introduction. 
Some, such as the Maximite SM1, and Geoff Graham's latest version, the Mini-Maximite, are  hardware- and software-compatible with the original design, but use a different form factor.

Others, like the DuinoMite, from the Bulgarian company Olimex, have altered the hardware by adding Arduino headers. This makes it easier to use hardware designed for Arduino boards, but modified firmware is needed to use this functionality. Some of these changes have been incorporated in the official version as it gets updated.

Australian Distributor Dontronics and United States programmer Ken Segler have been active in adapting the software to run on the different versions of the hardware. 

Geoff Graham has also released an altered version of MMBasic  for the UBW32 development Board. 

Maximite clones made by US producer CircuitGizmos remain compatible with the original Maximite design and include a very small CGMMSTICK1  that can be used with solderless breadboards, and a Colour Maximite compatible CGCOLORMAX1.

MMBasic
MMBasic 3.x has support for user defined subroutines and modern Line-numberless structure. This MMBasic 3.x has been released in several versions including support for the Olimex Duinomite, UBW32 and CGMMStick variants.

While the versions of MMBasic prior to 3.x were available as free and open-source software distributed under the GNU General Public License, for the 3.x versions the license was changed to a proprietary one, with the source code available free of charge for personal use.

ICeemite
On 11 May 2013, an IC-style version named DTX2-4105C (later given the name "ICeemite"), entirely designed for inclusion into embedded systems was announced by the Australian company Dimitech. This new revision of the original Maximite brings a real-time clock and a microSD card connector on board and fits into a PLCC-68 socket. As of the day of announcement it was the world's smallest full Maximite system.
ICeemite offers custom built firmware with additional extras used in embedded systems such as multitasking and power management, but does not support colour graphics.

Colour Maximite

A new version of the Maximite was featured in the September 2012 Issue of Silicon Chip Magazine. 

New features in the Colour Maximite are.
 100pin Version PIC32
 Colour VGA with eight colours (black, red, green, blue, cyan, yellow, purple and white).
 Synthesised stereo music and sound effects.
 Battery backed real time clock (optional).
 Arduino compatible connector with an additional 20 I/O lines that are independent of the original 20 I/Os.
 2 channel PWM analog output.
 Special commands for animated games. 
 Version 4.0 of MMBasic which has extra commands to access and utilise the additional features.

Several software and hardware projects have been created utilizing the Maximite in the 12 months since it was first announced. These range from simple dataloggers to complex process controllers.

Colour Maximite 2 (Gen 1)
The Colour Maximite 2 was introduced in mid-2020, and was featured in the July 2020 issue of Silicon Chip magazine.   

Specifications: 

 CPU: 480MHz 32-bit ARM Cortex-M7 with 2MB flash
 RAM: 1MB on-chip plus 8MB off-chip RAM
 Display: Colour VGA output at up to 800×600; 8-bit (256 colour), 12-bit (4096 colour) and 16-bit (65,536 colour) display modes
 Audio: Stereo audio output supporting WAV, FLAC, MP3 and MOD file playback, synthesised speech and sound effect support
 Storage: SD card up to 128GB; FAT16, FAT32 and exFAT file systems supported
 Battery backed real time clock (standard)
 USB keyboard support
 I/O: 28 external I/O lines with Raspberry Pi hat-compatible pinout; Nintendo Wii nunchuck support
 Serial I/O: Communications protocols including 2×serial, 2×I²C, 2×SPI and Dallas 1-Wire

The Colour Maximite 2 runs MMBasic 5.x and includes a compatibility mode to run programs written for the original Colour Maximite.

Colour Maximite 2 (Gen 2)
The Colour Maximite Gen 2 was announced in mid-2021, and was featured in the August 2021 issue of Silicon Chip magazine. This is an enhanced version of the Colour Maximite 2, relying on more surface mounted components than the Gen 1, thus being optimised for automated machine assembly. 

Enhancements over and above the Colour Maximite Gen 1 include upgraded graphics (1920x1080 with 24-bit colour), on board support for a mouse, accurate real time clock, ESP-01 WiFi module and an extra Wii nunchuck port on the front panel.  

As at September 2021, there are over 100 programs available for both versions of the Colour Maximite 2.

References

External links 
 Geoff Graham's WebSite
  Information Site covering ALL Maximite Basic (MMBasic) Versions
 CGCOLORMAX (ColorMax) WebSite
 CGMMSTICK WebSite
 Australian Forum Covering the MaxiMite and clones
 Beginning Maximite Documentation
 Olimex WebSite
 Dontronics Maximite WebSite
 Altronics WebSite

Microcomputers
Microchip Technology hardware